Josh Dockerill is an English professional footballer who plays as a defender for  club Portsmouth.

Career
Dockerill made his first-team debut for Portsmouth on 1 November 2022, after coming on as a 61st-minute substitute in a 1–1 draw with AFC Wimbledon in the EFL Trophy.

Style of play
Dockerill can play as a defender or as a midfielder, and is able to push forward from defence to help create attacks.

Career statistics

References

Living people
English footballers
Association football defenders
Association football midfielders
Portsmouth F.C. players
English Football League players
Year of birth missing (living people)